Martine Oppliger-Bouchonneau (born 19 October 1957) is a Swiss long-distance runner. She competed in the women's 10,000 metres at the 1988 Summer Olympics.

References

1957 births
Living people
Athletes (track and field) at the 1988 Summer Olympics
Swiss female long-distance runners
Olympic athletes of Switzerland
Place of birth missing (living people)